Evren Büker (born July 6, 1985) is a Turkish professional basketball player, who lastly played for Bursaspor of the Turkish Basketball Super League (BSL). He plays at the swingman position.

External links
TBLStat.net Profile
Eurocup Profile

1985 births
Living people
Bahçeşehir Koleji S.K. players
Bursaspor Basketbol players
Eskişehir Basket players
Galatasaray S.K. (men's basketball) players
Karşıyaka basketball players
Oyak Renault basketball players
Shooting guards
Sportspeople from Bursa
Tofaş S.K. players
Turkish men's basketball players
Türk Telekom B.K. players